The High Road is a live EP by the English rock band Roxy Music. Recorded at the Apollo in Glasgow, Scotland on 30 September 1982 during the band's Avalon tour, it features four tracks. Two of the songs are covers, including Roxy Music's no.1 hit version of John Lennon's "Jealous Guy" and Neil Young's "Like A Hurricane". A Bryan Ferry solo effort "Can't Let Go" was also included, originally released on his 1978 album The Bride Stripped Bare, with the remaining track being a version of "My Only Love" from Flesh + Blood, with an extended instrumental section. The EP reached number 26 on the UK Album Charts. and did even better in Canada, reaching #5 in May 1983.

Despite sharing the same title, there are no recordings on this album in common with the High Road videocassette/DVD, which was recorded in Fréjus, France on 27 August 1982. The four songs from the EP appeared on the live album Heart Still Beating (1990) mixed with the rest of the songs from the Fréjus concert.

Track listing

Personnel 
Roxy Music
 Bryan Ferry – vocals, keyboards
 Phil Manzanera – guitars
 Andy Mackay – saxophone, oboe
Additional personnel 
 Neil Hubbard – guitar
 Guy Fletcher – keyboards
 Alan Spenner – bass
 Andy Newmark – drums
 Jimmy Maelen – percussion
 Tawatha Agee – backing vocals
 Michelle Cobb – backing vocals
 Fonzi Thornton – backing vocals

Charts

Notes 

1983 EPs
Live EPs
1983 live albums
Roxy Music live albums
Roxy Music EPs
Albums produced by Rhett Davies